Ella Fitzgerald's Christmas is a 1967 studio album by Ella Fitzgerald. It was her second and last Christmas album. Unlike Ella Wishes You a Swinging Christmas, her previous Christmas album which was entirely secular, this album consists only of religious Christmas songs. It was her second album for Capitol Records. It charted at #27 on Billboards Holiday Albums chart.

Track listing
For the 1967 LP on Capitol Records; Capitol ST ST 2805; re-issued in 2000 on CD, Capitol 7243 5 27674 2 7

Side One:
 "O Holy Night" (Adolphe Adam, John Sullivan Dwight) – 1:47
 "It Came Upon a Midnight Clear" (Edmund Hamilton Sears, Richard Storrs Willis) – 3:21
 "Hark! The Herald Angels Sing" (Felix Mendelssohn, Charles Wesley) – 1:49
 "Away in a Manger" (Traditional) – 2:12
 "Joy to the World" (Lowell Mason, Isaac Watts) – 1:40
 "The First Noel" (William B. Sandys) – 1:50
 "Silent Night" (Franz Xaver Gruber, Joseph Mohr) – 2:52
Side Two:
 "O Come All Ye Faithful" (Frederick Oakeley, John Francis Wade) – 2:45
 "Sleep, My Little Jesus" – 2:17
 "Angels We Have Heard on High" (Traditional) – 1:45
 "O Little Town of Bethlehem" (Phillip Brooks, Lewis H. Redner) – 2:10
 "We Three Kings" (John Henry Hopkins Jr.) – 2:07
 "God Rest Ye Merry Gentlemen" (Traditional) – 1:27

Personnel

Performance
 Ella Fitzgerald – vocal
 Ralph Carmichael – arranger, conductor

References

Ella Fitzgerald albums
1967 Christmas albums
Albums arranged by Ralph Carmichael
Albums conducted by Ralph Carmichael
Albums produced by Dave Dexter Jr.
Capitol Records Christmas albums
Christmas albums by American artists
Covers albums
Jazz Christmas albums